George Chapman (21 April 1904 – 22 May 1986) was an Australian cricketer. He played one first-class match for New South Wales in 1924/25.

See also
 List of New South Wales representative cricketers

References

External links
 

1904 births
1986 deaths
Australian cricketers
New South Wales cricketers
Cricketers from Sydney